Tiruchirapalli-I is a former state assembly constituency in Tamil Nadu.

Madras State

Tamil Nadu

Election results

2006

2001

1996

1991

1989

1984

1980

1977

1971

1967

1962

1957

1952

Post delimitation 
Tiruchirappalli – I (State Assembly Constituency) has been renamed as Tiruchirappalli West after the constituency delimitations 2008.

References

External links
 

Former assembly constituencies of Tamil Nadu
Government of Tiruchirappalli